The Horse project is a proposed joint venture that is set to develop and manufacture internal combustion engined and hybrid powertrains. It would be owned by Renault and Geely.

Tentatively named Horse project by Renault, the proposed 50-50 partnership is set to develop the new powertrains in five global research and development centers. The Renault Group and Geely namesake brands would be the first to receive the powertrains and they would later be supplied to Dacia, Volvo, Lynk & Co and Proton cars, as well as Nissan and Mitsubishi Motors ones. Sourcing to third parties is also part of the plan.

References

Vehicle manufacturing companies